Women’s Prison is a 2002 Iranian drama film directed by Manijeh Hekmat.

Plot 
The new head of the prison has new rules for criminals, but Mitra (Roya Nonahali), one of the prisoners who is imprisoned for the murder of her stepfather, does not obey these rules.

Cast 
 Pegah Ahangarani
 Roya Teymourian
 Golab Adineh
 Maryam Boubani
 Roya Nonahali
 Farkhondeh Farmanizadeh

Awards

References

External links

2002 films
Iranian drama films
2000s Persian-language films
Films directed by Manijeh Hekmat